Matteo Bonechi (8 November 1669 in Florence – 27 February 1756 in Florence) was an Italian painter of the late Baroque period, active mainly in Florence. He trained under Giovanni Camillo Sagrestani.  He also executed works in the church of San Frediano in Cestello, in the Oltrarno district of Florence. He also painted for the Palazzo Capponi-Covoni near the Nunziata in Florence.

Sources
Italian Wikipedia entry

1669 births
1756 deaths
17th-century Italian painters
Italian male painters
18th-century Italian painters
Painters from Florence
Italian Baroque painters
18th-century Italian male artists